Lycodapus is a genus of marine ray-finned fishes belonging to the family Zoarcidae, the eelpouts. The species in this genus are found in the Pacific and Southern Oceans.

Taxonomy
Lycodapus was first proposed as a monospecific genus in 1890 by the American ichthyologist Charles Henry Gilbert when he described Lycodapus fierasfer from the Gulf of California. This genus is classified within the subfamily Lycodinae, one of 4 subfamilies in the family Zoarcidae, the eelpouts. This genus is the sister taxon to Bothrocara, Bothrocarina  and Lycogrammoides, and these four genera form a clade within the subfamily Lycodinae.

Etymology
Lycodapus is a compound of the Greek word or "wolf", lykos, a reference to the type genus of the Lycodinae, abd apous, which means "without feet", an allusion to the lack of pelvic fins in this genus.

Species 
Lycodapus contains the following species:

Characteristics
Lycodapus eelpouts have bodies which vary from slender to robust, the depth varying between 3.2% to 10% of the standard length. They may have transparent, gelatinous or opaque skin with no scales present. There are also no oral valve, occipital pores or pelvic fins. The only suborbital bone present is the lacrimal. The gill slit is not joined to the isthmus to its rear. The flesh is gelatinous. In males the front teeth in the jaw are canine like. The pseudobranch,  vomerine and palatine teeth are normally present. The pectoral fin has between 5 and 9 rays.

Distribution and habitat
Lycodapus eelpouts are found mainly in the eastern Pacific Ocean with some species extending into the Bering Sea and westerm North Pacific Oceans and others extending in to the Southern Ocean. They appear to be mesopelagic fishes with most specimens being collected in open nets. There is also some evidence for diel vertical migration which has been described for Lycodapus mandibularis.

References

Lycodinae
Taxa named by Charles Henry Gilbert